Ross William Ford (born 23 April 1984) is a Strength and Conditioning coach for the Scottish Rugby Academy. He was previously a Scotland international rugby union player who played as a hooker. He made 110 test appearances for Scotland, making him their most-capped male player. He played in three World Cups (2007, 2011 and 2015) and toured with the British & Irish Lions in 2009, making one appearance.

Ford played professional rugby for Border Reivers (2002–2007) and then Edinburgh Rugby between 2007 and 2019.

Rugby Union career

Amateur career

Ross Ford grew up in Kelso and went to Kelso High School in the Scottish Borders. He played for Kelso Harlequins (u18s) and then Kelso RFC.

Professional career

In May 2002 Ford signed for Border Reivers, before he had finished school.

Ford initially played at loose forward, but was convinced to switch to hooker while at Border Reivers.

After the Reivers disbandment in the summer of 2007, Ford was left without a club. He initially signed for the Glasgow Warriors in August 2007 but on 18 October 2007 it was announced that he had been transferred to Edinburgh who were back under the Scottish Rugby Union's control in that year.

Ford made his 150th appearance for Edinburgh in December 2015.

International career

Ford was a member of the Commonwealth Games Scotland 7s squad at Manchester in 2002.

Ford captained Scotland under-16 and has also represented his country at under-18 and under-19 level.  He is a member of the Scottish Institute of Sport.

Ford was first capped by the Scotland senior side in the 2004 Abbey Autumn Tests against Australia at Murrayfield, making his second appearance over a year later, coming on as a replacement against Wales in the 2006 RBS 6 Nations. After one further appearance against England he missed the 2006 summer tour to South Africa through a knee injury but returned to the Scotland squad in the 2007–08 season.

Ford made his first start in the RBS 6 Nations Championship in Scotland's final match of the 2007 competition, away to France. He followed that up by winning plaudits for his line out throwing and play in both tight and loose in Scotland's World Cup warm-up victory against Ireland.

Ford was named in Scotland's Rugby World Cup 2007 squad, and became the first choice hooker after the previous #1 hooker Dougie Hall pulled out of the whole World Cup altogether with injury. In his first match at the tournament he came on as a replacement against Portugal and scored his first try for Scotland.

In 2009, Ford was selected for the British & Irish Lions as a replacement for Jerry Flannery. He played for 50 minutes in the third test and was Scotland's only representative in the three test matches of that tour. Ford was the captain of the Scotland Team for the 2012 Six Nations Championship and the 2012 mid-year rugby test series.

In June 2014 Ford made his 76th appearance and overtook Gordon Bulloch as Scotland's most-capped hooker. In August 2015 he won his 88th cap against Italy, overtaking Scott Murray as Scotland's most capped forward. His one hundredth cap came against Australia in November 2016, with only two other Scots previously having gained 100 caps- Chris Paterson and Sean Lamont.

On 24 June 2017 Ford made his 110th test appearance for Scotland and overtook Chris Paterson as the most capped Scot.

Coaching career

On 27 June 2019 it was announced that Ford was retired from playing rugby. Instead he took a role as a Strength and Conditioning coach at the Scottish Rugby Academy.

Other

In 2011 Ford appeared on cereal boxes for Scott's Porage Oats along with Chris Paterson and Thom Evans.

References

External links
profile at Scottish Rugby

1984 births
Living people
Border Reivers players
British & Irish Lions rugby union players from Scotland
Edinburgh Rugby players
Glasgow Warriors players
Jed-Forest RFC players
Kelso RFC players
People educated at Kelso High School, Scotland
Rugby union hookers
Rugby union players from Kelso
Rugby union strength and conditioning coaches
Scotland international rugby union players
Scottish rugby union coaches
Scottish rugby union players